Liang En-shuo and Wang Xinyu won the girls' doubles tennis title at the 2018 Australian Open, defeating Violet Apisah and Lulu Sun in the final, 7–6(7–4), 4–6, [10–5].

Bianca Andreescu and Carson Branstine were the defending champions, but both players chose not to participate.

Seeds

Draw

Finals

Top half

Bottom half

References
 Main Draw

Girls' Doubles
Australian Open, 2018 Girls' Doubles
Aust
Aust